Zou is an animated children's television series inspired by the books of French author Michel Gay. The show was produced by the French company Cyber Group Studios for Disney EMEA. It premiered on Disney Junior (UK & Ireland) in May 2012.

Premise and format
Zou is about the day-to-day life and adventures of a young anthropomorphic zebra, Zou (Bizou), and his family and friends. Most episodes contain Zou's name in the title and usually take place at Zou's house or in his backyard. Zou lives with his mother, father, grandparents, and great-grandmother. Each episode features some simple problem or issue that Zou must deal with, usually with the assistance of his family and friends.

Characters
Bizou David Stripeman (Zou): A 5-year-old, fun-loving zebra. Zou is generally clad in a white T-shirt under yellow overalls. He is the main protagonist of the show, and shows interest in many career paths. His next-door neighbor is Elzee. A running plot of the show is that Zou exits school at the beginning of the episode. Then Zou mentions interest in a certain career. He is then countered by neighbor Elzee stating "I thought you wanted to be a (other career path)." Zou responds by saying "That was last week, now I want to be a (new career path.)" Voiced in the U.S. version by Kannon Gowen.
Poc: A Quaker parakeet, and Zou's constant companion. It is unclear whether Poc is considered a pet or a "person", since several signs of anthropomorphism are shown in Poc's character, and yet Poc cannot talk. Also, it seems like the show's conception of "humans" is reserved to zebras only. Poc lives inside what looks like a cuckoo clock in Zou's bedroom.
Elzee Blackhoof: Zou's next door neighbor. The same age as Zou, Elzee is generally clad in a long purple dress. Her ears seem to be rather large, in comparison to the other characters, and even make her slightly taller than Zou. She is far more sensible than Zou and often contradicts his outrageous ideas, but still joins in. She seems to harbour a romantic attraction to Zou, often acting shy or giggling with rembarrassment when he compliments her. She is a bit more of a tomboy than Zinnia, and seems to enjoy soccer, often taking part in Zou's extravagant activities. In the British English version of the show her voice is portrayed by Roisin Gadd (Seasons 1 & 2) and Maisie Jack (Season 3).
Zinnia Stripeman: Zou's cousin. She's a budding ballerina who sometimes tends to be snooty and stuck-up. She is never seen without dance clothes on and is more feminine in comparison to Elzee who is a bit more tomboyish. It seems that she is an unofficial antagonist of the show. Zou does not seem to like her very much and often makes excuses to avoid having to play with her. She often tries to engage Zou in girlish pastimes such as playing princesses or playing with dolls / stuffed toys, apparently unaware he has absolutely no interest in such things. Despite being a snob, Zinnia is sometimes shown to care for Zou.
Zak A. Zoey, Jr.: An eager and chubby young zebra, and another of Zou's friends. He is slightly younger than Zou and Elzee and is generally clad in a red T-shirt, with what appears to be a lime green letter "J" on it, and khaki shorts. His father is Mr. Zoey. No mother of Zak has ever been mentioned.
Dad: Zou's father.
Mum ("Mom" in the U.S. version): Zou's mother, who often calls him by his full name, "Bizou." She works at a local hospital.
Grandpa: Zou's paternal grandfather. He is a rather handy zebra, usually found in the garage, building something.
Grandma: Zou's paternal grandmother. She is often found baking cakes and other confections.
Nana: Zou's great-grandmother. She often gives Zou big, sloppy kisses on the cheek. She is talented on the piano, able to play the show's theme song among other songs, and also sings. According to the show's official website, she is slightly deaf.
Uncle Zavier Stripeman: Zinnia's father. He is a wealthy businessman and owns the largest house in the neighborhood. Though you never see this in the show.
Aunt Zelda Stripeman: Zinnia's mother. She runs the family's high-end boutique alongside Uncle Xavier.
Mr. Zoey: The local shopkeeper/postman, and Zak's father. He is friendly and helpful.
Mrs. Brenda Zolli: The school crossing guard.

Broadcast
The series airs on Disney Junior channels in Australia, New Zealand, the United Kingdom, Ireland, Portugal, and Disney Junior (Latin America), as well as Super RTL. The program premiered in France on December 22, 2012, on France 5. It premiered in the U.S. on Universal Kids (then called PBS Kids Sprout) on September 2, 2013, and has been shown on NBC Kids until 2016, complete with a dub into American English. The American dub was available in the United States on Hulu Plus until December 10, 2019, and can still be watched on Amazon Prime Video and YouTube via the official "ZOU in English" channel.

The episodes, lasting 11 minutes each, are generally transmitted two at a time, the second immediately after the first one, except on some channels such as PBS Kids Sprout, NIKI Junior in Ukraine, and Clan in Spain, where the episodes are shown individually. In Wales it is shown on S4C in Welsh as Stiw And TG4 In Ireland.

Episodes

References

External links
 
 Cyber Group Studios - Zou

2010s French animated television series
2012 French television series debuts
French children's animated adventure television series
French television shows based on children's books
French computer-animated television series
Fictional zebras
Animated television series about mammals
Animated television series about children
Universal Kids original programming
Disney Junior original programming
French-language television shows
English-language television shows